St George's Church stands in the centre of the town of Poynton, Cheshire, England.  It is an active Anglican parish church in the deanery of Cheadle, the archdeaconry of Macclesfield, and the diocese of Chester.  The church is recorded in the National Heritage List for England as a designated Grade II listed building. It is the tallest building in Poynton.

History
The original church in the town was a chapel of ease to St Peter, Prestbury, and was in existence by 1312.  The present church was built in 1858–59 on a site nearer to the town centre to a design by J. S. Crowther.  It was consecrated in February 1859 by the bishop of Chester.  It became a separate parish in its own right in 1871.  The steeple, designed by J. Medland Taylor and Henry Taylor, was added in 1884–85.  In 1998 the interior of the church was re-ordered.

Architecture

Exterior
St George's is constructed in yellow rubble stone from the Hig Lane quarry, and has dressings in stone from Lyme Handley.  It is roofed in slate.  The plan consists of a nave with a six-bay clerestory, north and south five-bay aisles, a south porch, a chancel, and a steeple at the southeast corner.  The tower has buttresses and an octagonal stair turret, and is surmounted by a broached spire with lucarnes.  In the top stage are double louvred bell openings.  Along the sides of the aisles are two-light windows, and along the clerestory are alternate two-light and circular windows.  At the west end of the nave are two narrow lancet windows, above which is a sexfoil rose window.  The east window has four lights containing Geometric tracery.

Interior
Inside the church is a three-bay arcade carried on octagonal piers. In the chancel are a stone sedilia and piscina.  The stained glass in the east and southeast windows is by O'Connor (probably Arthur).  At the east end of the north aisle is a window dating from about 1866 by John Adam Heaton.  A window in the southwest of the church dating from about 1935 was designed by Edwin Wright, and commemorates the Mothers' Union.  The two-manual organ was built in 1972 by Smethurst of Manchester, replacing a three-manual 19th-century organ by Nicholson and Lord that had been rebuilt by Austin Jones of Pendleton in 1925.  There is a ring of six bells, all cast in 1887 by John Taylor & Co of Loughborough.  There is a further, unused, bell dating from 1835 by Thomas Mears II at the Whitechapel Bell Foundry.

External features
The churchyard contains the war graves of ten British service personnel, three of World War I and seven of World War II.

See also

Listed buildings in Poynton with Worth
List of works by J. S. Crowther

References

Church of England church buildings in Cheshire
Grade II listed churches in Cheshire
Churches completed in 1885
19th-century Church of England church buildings
Gothic Revival church buildings in England
Gothic Revival architecture in Cheshire
Diocese of Chester
Poynton